The 2022 Basque Pelota World Championships will be the 19th edition of the Basque Pelota World Championships organized by the FIPV.

Participating nations

Events
A total of 16 events will be disputed, in 4 playing areas.

Trinquete, 6 events disputed

Fronton (30 m), 4 events disputed

Fronton (36 m), 4 events disputed

Fronton (54 m), 2 event disputed

Frontball, 2 event disputed

Medal table

References

World Championships,2018
2022 in French sport
International sports competitions hosted by France
World Championships,2022
World Championships
October 2022 sports events in France